The following highways are numbered 736:

Ireland
 R736 regional road

United States